Clominorex is a centrally acting sympathomimetic which is related to other drugs such as aminorex and pemoline. It was developed as an appetite suppressant by McNeil Laboratories in the 1950s.

See also
 4-Methylaminorex
 Aminorex
 Cyclazodone
 Fenozolone
 Fluminorex
 Pemoline
 Thozalinone

References

Stimulants
Aminorexes
Chloroarenes
Norepinephrine-dopamine releasing agents